String or strings may refer to:

String (structure), a long flexible structure made from threads twisted together, which is used to tie, bind, or hang other objects

Arts, entertainment, and media

Films
 Strings (1991 film), a Canadian animated short
 Strings (2004 film), a film directed by Anders Rønnow Klarlund
 Strings (2011 film), an American dramatic thriller film
 Strings (2012 film), a British film by Rob Savage
 Bravetown (2015 film), an American drama film originally titled Strings
 The String (2009), a French film

Music

Instruments
 String (music), the flexible element that produces vibrations and sound in string instruments
 String instrument, a musical instrument that produces sound through vibrating strings
 List of string instruments
 String piano, a pianistic extended technique in which sound is produced by direct manipulation of the strings, rather than striking the piano's keys

Types of groups
 String band, musical ensemble composed mostly or entirely of string instruments, common in bluegrass, jazz, and country music
 String orchestra, orchestra composed solely or primarily of instruments from the string family
 String quartet, musical ensemble of four string players, common in chamber music ensembles
 String section ("the strings"), section of a larger symphony orchestra composed of string musicians

Genres
 String (Thai pop), a genre of Thai pop music

Performers
 Strings (band), a pop rock band from Pakistan
 String Sisters, band

Recordings
 Strings (EP), an EP by Kristin Hersh
 Strings (Strings album), the debut album by Strings
Strings!, a 1967 album by jazz guitarist Pat Martino
 "Strings", by Blink-182 from Buddha, 1994
 "Strings", by Shawn Mendes from Handwritten, 2015
 "Strings, Strings", by Gerald Levert from G, 2000

Other uses in arts, entertainment, and media
 "String", a Monty Python sketch about a marketing campaign for string, appearing initially on their Contractual Obligation Album
 String, a character controlled by Marik in the Yu-Gi-Oh! Japanese manga
 Silly String, a child's toy, also known as aerosol string

Fashion
 String bikini
 Thong, C-string, G-string, V-string

Foods and cooking
 String of a bean, in cooking, is the hard fibrous spine that runs the length of the pod in all but stringless varieties
 String bean, a name for several different varieties of bean
 String cheese, a common name for several different types of cheese
 String hopper, a rice noodle dish

Mathematics
 String graph, an intersection graph of curves in the plane; each curve is called a "string"
 String group, in group theory

Science and technology

Bioinformatics
 STRING (Search Tool for the Retrieval of Interacting Genes/Proteins), a database and web resource of known and predicted protein-protein interactions

Computer sciences
 String (computer science), sequence of alphanumeric text or other symbols in computer programming
 String (C++), a class in the C++ Standard Library
 Strings (Unix), a Unix program for finding character strings in binary files
 C string handling, a header in the C standard library
 String literal, the notation for representing a string value within the text of a computer program
 Connection string, a string that specifies information about a data source and the means of connecting to it
 Deployment environment, one in a series of computing environments in which new software is deployed, either in sequence or in parallel

Drilling
 Casing string
 Drill string
 Production string

Medicine
 Brock string, an instrument used in vision therapy
 String galvanometer, an instrument that provided the first practical electrocardiogram (ECG)
 String sign, a medical term used in diagnosing hypertrophy pyloric stenosis

Physics
 Cosmic string, a hypothetical 1-dimensional (spatially) topological defect in various fields
 Dirac string, a fictitious one-dimensional curve in space, stretching between two magnetic monopoles
 String theory, a popular grand unified theory
 String (physics), one of the main objects of study in string theory
 Black string is a higher-dimensional (more than 4-dimensional) generalization of a black hole

Other uses in science and technology
 Yaw string, also known as a slip string, a simple device for indicating a slip or skid in an aircraft in flight
 String bog, a bog consisting of slightly elevated ridges and islands, with woody plants, alternating with flat, wet sedge mat areas
 String potentiometer, a transducer used to detect and measure linear position and velocity using a flexible cable and spring-loaded spool

Sports
 String, a series of consecutive wins in baseball jargon
 Strings (tennis), the part of a tennis racket which makes contact with the ball

Other uses
 Pushing on a string, metaphor
 String of cash coins (currency unit), in the Far East
 String Lake, a lake in Grand Teton National Park, Wyoming, United States.
 String Publishing, an imprint of the German group VDM Publishing devoted to the reproduction of Wikipedia content
 String puzzle, any mechanical puzzle whose emphasis is on manipulating one or more pieces of string or rope
 String ribbon, ribbon made of string
 String trimmer, a device for cutting grass and other small plants
 Strings, the nickname of the Swedish musician Robert Dahlqvist

See also
 
 
 Chain (disambiguation)
 Heart Strings (disambiguation)
 Red string (disambiguation)
 Strine (disambiguation)
 String of pearls (disambiguation)